John Brian Gilbert (17 July 1887 – 28 July 1974) was an English men's singles tennis player.

Gilbert competed in the 1924 Summer Olympics and the 1922-1933 Wimbledon Championships. Gilbert reached the semi finals at Wimbledon in 1922, beating Theodore Mavrogordato before losing to Randolph Lycett.

Grand Slam finals

Mixed doubles: (1 title)

References

External links
 
 
 

1887 births
1974 deaths
English male tennis players
Olympic tennis players of Great Britain
Tennis players at the 1924 Summer Olympics
British male tennis players
Place of birth missing
Year of death unknown
Wimbledon champions (pre-Open Era)
Grand Slam (tennis) champions in mixed doubles